A+X is a monthly comic book anthology series that was published by Marvel Comics from October 2012 to March 2014 as part of the company's Marvel NOW! initiative. Each issue includes two stories by different creative teams featuring a different team-up of an Avenger and an X-Man.

Publication history
The series was launched as a follow-up to the 2012 event Avengers Vs. X-Men and its spinoff title, AVX: VS. According to X-Men editor Nick Lowe, "Because AvX Versus did so well, and we enjoyed doing it so much and the fans embraced it so much, we wanted to keep that kind of thing going. With Versus there are two 10-page stories per issue. The top talent telling the story, with the best characters that Marvel has to offer. A+X is going to follow up with that, and we're going to have an Avenger and an X-Man on each team." The series came to an end with issue #18 in March 2014.

Issues

Collected editions

References

External links
A+X at Marvel.com

Comics anthologies
Team-up comics